Magic Lantern is a firmware add-on for various Canon digital single-lens reflex (DSLR) cameras and the EOS M. It adds features for DSLR filmmaking and still photography, and is free and open-source. 

Magic Lantern was originally written for the Canon EOS 5D Mark II by Trammell Hudson in 2009 after he reverse engineered its firmware. He ported it to the Canon EOS 550D in July 2010. There are now versions for many other Canon DSLRs and the current principal developer is known as A1ex.

Since installing Magic Lantern does not replace the stock Canon firmware or modify the ROM but rather runs alongside it, it is both easy to remove and carries little risk. The camera checks a "boot flag" in its re-writable memory, and if set, reads from a memory card to get the additional firmware routines. Each time the camera is started, there is an option to disable Magic Lantern.

History
Magic Lantern firmware was originally written for the Canon EOS 5D Mark II by Trammell Hudson in 2009 after he reverse engineered its firmware. He ported it to the Canon EOS 550D in July 2010.

Starting in September 2010, a person using the name "A1ex" on the CHDK (Canon Hack Development Kit) website forum and other people ported Magic Lantern to the Canon EOS 50D, 60D, 500D and 600D. As of August 2017 support for the Canon EOS 5D, 5D Mk III, 6D, 7D, 60Da, 650D, 700D, and 1100D DSLRs and the mirror-less EOS M had also been added. Later mirrorless cameras are not supported because they use a codebase similar to Canon PowerShot cameras rather than Canon EOS cameras; therefore CHDK ports are planned.

Originally developed for DSLR filmmaking, Magic Lantern's features have expanded to also include those for still photography.

Features
 Firmware and source code is released under the GNU General Public License.
 Audio controls, on-screen audio meter, audio monitoring via A/V cable
 HDR video, bitrate control, FPS control, auto-restart
 Precise ISO, White Balance, and Shutter Speed controls
 Zebras, false colour, raw histogram, waveform, spot meter, vectorscope
 Focus peaking, 'magic zoom', trap focus, rack focus, follow focus, motion detection
 Automatic Exposure Bracketing, focus stacking
 Intervalometer, bulb timer (up to 8 hours), bulb ramping
 Custom cropmarks/on-screen graphics
 On-screen focus and DOF info, CMOS temperature, clock
 Customizable menus and scripting
 Customizable "P" Program mode
 14-bit raw video on some DSLRs
 Dual-ISO for increased dynamic range up to about 3 EV, with trade-off of somewhat less resolution and more complicated post processing involving cr2dng
 Auto-Dot-Tune on some DSLRs for automatic micro-focus-adjustment to calibrate lens and body (5D Mk II, 6D, 50D, 5D Mk III and 7D)

Original Canon warranty

Because installing Magic Lantern does not replace the stock Canon firmware or modify the ROM but rather runs alongside it, it is both easy to remove and carries little risk. Canon has not made any official statements regarding the add-on firmware, either on the subject of warranty or on the features. In response to emails Canon has stated that while their warranty doesn't cover damage caused by third party firmware it will cover unrelated issues such as malfunctioning buttons even if third party firmware has been installed.

See also 
 AXIOM (camera)

References

External links  
 
 

Canon EOS DSLR cameras
Camera firmware
Free software
Custom firmware